This is a list of the National Register of Historic Places listings in Callahan County, Texas.

This is intended to be a complete list of properties listed on the National Register of Historic Places in Callahan County, Texas. There are two properties listed on the National Register in the county. One site is also a Recorded Texas Historic Landmark.

Current listings

The locations of National Register properties may be seen in a mapping service provided.

|}

See also

National Register of Historic Places listings in Texas
Recorded Texas Historic Landmarks in Callahan County

References

External links

Callahan County, Texas
Callahan County
Buildings and structures in Callahan County, Texas